Pectodictyon is a genus of green algae in the family Sphaerodictyaceae.

References

External links

Chlamydomonadales genera
Chlamydomonadales